Paadatha Painkili is an Indian Malayalam television soap opera which airs on Malayalam Entertainment Channel Asianet and is available on the digital platform Disney+ Hotstar. The show is produced by Merryland Studio of P. Subramaniam. 
It is a remake of the Bengali serial Ke Apon Ke Por.

Plot
The plot focuses on the story of Kanmani. Both Ananda Varma and his wife Susheela treat Kanmani as their own daughter, but their daughters-in-law Swapna, Ananya and Tanuja who is also Anand's eldest daughter worry that Kanmani will inherit part of the family property, reducing their own shares. They mistreat Kanmani. Deva is Anand's youngest son. Deva takes a stand against the difficulties Kanmani faces.

Deva's girlfriend Madhurima comes from Dubai to visit his family. Ananya's brother Bharat attempts to kill Kanmani and is stopped by Deva. Deva has the idea that Kanmani should marry and decides to get her married to Ranjith. Ranjith and his family comes to visit and fixes the marriage. However, on the day of marriage, it is revealed that Ranjith is a criminal who marries wealthy women to take away their wealth and the police arrest Ranjith.

Meanwhile, Deva and Madhurima are planning to get engaged on Kanmani's wedding day. Madhurima gets the news that her father is ill and decides to go to her house. Kanmani's marriage is stopped, and Anand is blamed by everyone for Kanmani's pitiable position. Anand, who is in a devastated state, persuades Deva to marry Kanmani to mitigate the disaster of the failed wedding. Madhurima arrives at the last moment, just in time to see the wedding become official. Madhurima asks Deva whether he married Kanmani only out of pity, but Deva remains silent, and she leaves, angrily.

After Madhurima leaves, Deva allows himself to show his anger by throwing things. Susheela realises for the first time that her son has been sacrificed. She too becomes furious and turns against her husband, and eventually against Kanmani. Kanmani does not expect Deva to treat her like a real wife, so she continues to work as a maid. One day Susheela's sister comes to meet Deva's wife, not knowing the history, and she criticises the family for marrying a maid to their son. Humiliated, Susheela is persuaded by Swapna and Ananya to call Madhurima back. Meanwhile, Anand plans to hold a reception for the newlyweds. No one supports his decision except his youngest daughter Avantika.

Madhurima comes to the reception of Deva and Kanmani and creates drama when Deva accepts Kanmani as his wife. Then the couple prepares to spend their first night together. But Susheela suddenly begins to have chest pains. Deva panics and stays with his mother. Since she is not allowed to see Susheela, Kanmani sleeps alone in the room that she was to share with Deva. This event is a turning point, as Susheela and Deva begin to appreciate Kanmani. Swapna, Ananya and Bharat all try to undermine Kanmani and make her leave the house, but the result is that Deva begins to fall in love with her.

Deva entrusts Kanmani with documents relating to his confidential project hon topics to do with his work. Swapna, Ananya and Bharat steal the documents and put the blame on Kanmani. Deva is angry and says humiliating things to Kanmani. Kanmani finds the documents and reveals that Bharat was the thief but is so humiliated that she leaves the house. Deva later finds her and brings her home. Deva and Kanmani's relationship becomes stronger, and Deva confesses his love to Kanmani and she accepts.

Cast

Main
Maneesha Mahesh as Kanmani, Deva's wife. 
Sooraj Sun (episode 1–197) / Luckgith Saini (episode 198- 417) / Manu Martin Pallippadan (episode 418-present) as Deva, Kanmani's husband, Madhurima's ex-boyfriend.

Recurring
Prem Prakash (episode 1–6) / Dinesh Panicker (episode 6-present) as Ananda Varma, Vijay, Arvind, Tanuja, Deva and Avantika's father
Ambika Mohan as Susheela Devi, Vijay, Arvind, Tanuja, Deva and Avantika's mother
Fazal Razi as Vijay, Swapna's husband, Deva's eldest brother
Preetha Pradeep (episode 1–6) / Archana Suseelan (episodes 6–228)→ Amritha Varnan (episode 229-present) as Swapna,  Vijay's wife, eldest daughter-in-law of Anand Verma 
Sabarinath (episodes 1 to 48, deceased) / Pradeep Chandran (episodes 51 to 67) / Naveen Arakkal (episodes 67 – present) as Aravind, Ananya's husband, Deva's elder brother (dead)
Anjitha BR as Ananya, Arvind's wife, second daughter-in-law of the house, Thumbimol and Kunju's mother
Rahul R as Ravi, Tanuja's husband and Sheetal's father
Soumya Sreekumar / Kalyani Nair as Tanuja Ravi, Ravi's wife, Deva's elder sister and Anand Verma and Susheela Devi's eldest daughter, Sheetal's mother. 
Sachin SG as Bharath, Ananya's brother, Avantika's husband and Deva's Brother-in-Law
Anumol RS / Aiswarya Devi as Avanthika, Anand Verma and Susheela Devi's youngest daughter and Deva's younger sister, Bharath's wife
Ankhitha Vinod as Madhurima, Deva's ex-girlfriend
Kottayam Rasheed as Peppara Gowthaman, father of Ananya & Bharath,a local thug
Ashtami R Krishna as Sheethal, Tanuja and Ravi's daughter. She is physically disabled.
Sreelatha Namboothiri as Panamthottathil Elizabeth
Maneesh Krishna as Thejas
Sini Prasad as Sasikala
Baby Krishna Thejaswini as Thumbimol, Ananya and Aravind's daughter, Kunju's sister
Sidharth as Ranjith
Amboori Jayan as Sudhakaran
Chithra as Kanaka
Aparna P Nair as Devamma
Leena Nair as ACP Reetha Kurian
Alif Sha as Denson
Renjith Menon as Sachin
Sumi rashik as Shanthi

Development
On 8 July 2020, the first promo of the show, Lunch Time, was released by Asianet on YouTube. Later promos were released on 2, 19 and 20 August and the title song was released on 25 August 2020. The title song has become hit since its release on YouTube which was sung by KS Harishankar and Sithara Krishnakumar.

Reception
The show is premiered on Asianet on 7 September 2020 at 8:30 PM IST. Initially, the show earned good viewership, but it dropped when Sooraj Sun appeared as main protagonist left the show due to some health issues. Later the show moved to 10:00 PM IST due to low TRP ratings. On 28 March 2022, the show moved to 2:30 PM IST in respect to the timing of Bigg Boss season 4.From 28 November 2022, the show is again shifted back to 10:00 PM IST.

References

Malayalam-language television shows
Asianet (TV channel) original programming